Hemimyzon is a genus of ray-finned fish in the family Balitoridae.

Species 
There are currently 16 recognized species in this genus:
 Hemimyzon confluens Kottelat, 2000
 Hemimyzon ecdyonuroides Freyhof & Herder, 2002
 Hemimyzon elongata (Y. R. Chen & Z. Y. Li, 1985)
 Hemimyzon formosanus (Boulenger, 1894)
 Hemimyzon khonensis Kottelat, 2000
 Hemimyzon macroptera C. Y. Zheng, 1982
 Hemimyzon megalopseos Z. Y. Li & Y. R. Chen, 1985
 Hemimyzon nanensis A. Doi & Kottelat, 1998
 Hemimyzon nujiangensis (W. Zhang & C. Y. Zheng, 1983)
 Hemimyzon papilio Kottelat, 1998
 Hemimyzon pengi (S. Y. Huang, 1982)
 Hemimyzon pumilicorpora C. Y. Zheng & W. Zhang, 1987
 Hemimyzon sheni I. S. Chen & L. S. Fang, 2009
 Hemimyzon taitungensis C. S. Tzeng & S. C. Shen, 1982
 Hemimyzon tchangi C. Y. Zheng, 1982
 Hemimyzon yaotanensis (P. W. Fang, 1931)

References

 
Balitoridae
Fish of Asia
Taxonomy articles created by Polbot